The Paraguayan Cycling Federation (in Spanish: Federación Paraguaya de Ciclismo) is the national governing body of cycle racing in Paraguay.

It is a member of the UCI and COPACI.

External links
 Federación Paraguaya de Ciclismo official website

Cycle racing organizations
Cycle racing in Paraguay
Sports governing bodies in Paraguay